Riverside Park was a ballpark located in Austin, Texas, and was the home to many Austin teams starting in 1888 when the Austin Hix, the city's initial baseball team, combined with the Austin Red Sox to exist as the first edition of the Austin Senators. The ballpark was located southeast of Congress Avenue Bridge.

The ballpark was also the site of the largest shutout in Texas League history, played on July 23, 1907, between the Austin Senators and the San Antonio Bronchos in the second game of a doubleheader. In the early 20th century, Austin and San Antonio were bitter rivals, and this was no exception. During the first game, an Austin baserunner who had overslid third base was tagged out but was called safe by the umpire; at the time, there was only one umpire, who made all calls. The Bronchos felt slighted that day by the umpire on many calls, and tried to get the call changed. The umpire did not change his call, and the Bronchos left the field in protest, forfeiting the first game of the doubleheader to Austin. Because another forfeit was not viable, due to potential hefty fines levied by the league offices, San Antonio came up with a form of retaliation for the second game. Infielder Art Griggs was the starting pitcher; Griggs was relieved by another infielder, Ike Pendleton, soon after and followed by George "Cap" Leidy. The Senators batted in order the whole game while the Bronchos batted out-of-order whenever they wanted to. Austin stole 23 bases and scored 44 runs on 36 hits due to San Antonio's sloppy defense, including nine errors, and farcical pitching. The final score was Austin 44, San Antonio 0; more like a football score than baseball score.

Sources
 "San Antonio at Bat: Professional Baseball in the Alamo City," David King, c.2004
 "Baseball in the Lone Star State: Texas League's Greatest Hits," Tom Kayser and David King, Trinity University Press 2005

References

Baseball venues in Greater Austin
Baseball venues in Texas